Krutoye is a rural locality (a selo) and the administrative center of Krutovsky Selsoviet of Volodarsky District, Astrakhan Oblast, Russia. The population was 754 as of 2010. There are 9 streets.

Geography 
Krutoye is located 25 km southeast of Volodarsky (the district's administrative centre) by road. Korni is the nearest rural locality.

References 

Rural localities in Volodarsky District, Astrakhan Oblast